Rajendra Kumar Tuli (20 July 1927 – 12 July 1999) was an Indian actor who starred in Bollywood films. Starting his career in 1949, he appeared in more than 80 films in a career spanning over four decades. He was popularly known as the 'Jubilee Kumar' during the 1960s when he starred in several commercially successful films. 

He also produced several films starring his son Kumar Gaurav. The Government of India honored him with the Padma Shri in 1970.

Career
Rajendra Kumar was born in a Punjabi Hindu Khatri family in Sialkot, in the Punjab province of British India. His grandfather was a successful military contractor and his father had a textile business in Karachi, Sindh, British India. During the Partition of India, the family had to leave all the land and property behind and move to India. When they came to Bombay, Kumar decided to try his luck in the Hindi film industry. He never wanted to be a hero and took up work with director H. S. Rawail as an assistant. For nearly five years, he worked with Rawail as an assistant in films like Patanga, Sagai, Pocket Maar.

During this time, he made his film debut with a cameo in the 1949 film Patanga, followed by a small role in Kidar Sharma's 1950 film Jogan, opposite Dilip Kumar and Nargis. It was producer Devendra Goel who noticed Kumar in Jogan and gave him a break in Vachan in 1955. Kumar was paid only fifteen hundred rupees for the film; however, the film was a hit and was Kumar's first silver jubilee film and he was given a title – 'A star is Born'. He got further success with his supporting role in Mehboob Khan's blockbuster epic film Mother India in 1957 in which he played Nargis's character's son. His first major success as a romantic leading man was in Amit Saxena's musical Goonj Uthi Shehnai (1959), co-starring Ameeta.

The 1960s saw Kumar rise to stardom. There were times when he had six or seven films which had run for more than 25 weeks (known in India as a "silver jubilee film"), all running at the cinema at the same time, which rendered him the nickname "Jubilee Kumar". He starred in many box office hits including Dhool Ka Phool (1959), Gharana (1961), Dil Ek Mandir (1963), Mere Mehboob (1963), Sangam (1964), Ayee Milan Ki Bela (1964), Arzoo (1965), Suraj (1966), Jhuk Gaya Aasmaan (1968),  Talash (1969) and Ganwaar (1970). He received the Filmfare Nomination for Best Actor for Dil Ek Mandir (1963), Ayee Milan Ki Bela (1964), Arzoo (1965), and as Best Supporting Actor for Sangam (1964). He also starred in K. Asif's incomplete film Sasta Khoon Mehanga Paani co- starring Saira Banu. His brother Naresh Kumar directed him in films like Gora Aur Kala (1972) and Do Jasoos (1975).

From 1972 onwards, he faced competition from Rajesh Khanna and many of his films were flops. He then switched to character roles in the late 1970s and 1980s. He was offered a role in the film Saajan Bina Suhaagan opposite Nutan in 1978 which was a success. He also starred in a number of Punjabi films like Do Sher and Teri Meri Ik Jindri.

In 1981, Rajendra introduced his son Kumar Gaurav in the film Love Story which he produced and also starred in. The film was declared a blockbuster. Rajendra produced a few other films starring his son but none matched the success of Love Story with the exception of the 1986 film Naam, which featured his son starring alongside Sanjay Dutt. His last production was the 1993 film Phool which also didn't do well. In 1995, he acted in the television serials Andaz and Vansh which were his last acting roles.

Personal life

He married Shukla of the Behl family of Hindi films, a sister of Ramesh Behl and Shyam Behl and aunt of their sons Goldie Behl and Ravi Behl. He and Shukla had a son and two daughters. His son Kumar Gaurav also had a brief acting career. His daughter Dimple was married to Hollywood film producer Raju Patel. His sister Manorama was married to Indian film producer O. P. Ralhan. His younger brother was film director Naresh Kumar. 

Kumar acted with Sunil Dutt and Nargis in the film Mother India (1957) where Sunil Dutt and Rajendra Kumar played sons of Nargis's character. He had a special relationship with Dutt and used to actively participate in campaigning for him, whenever the latter used to contest for elections. Dutt quoted as having said that "Even though Rajendra Kumar did not win any award throughout his career, he was one of the most genuine human beings I have ever encountered. When I was struggling with the troubles related to the arrest of my son Sanjay Dutt and my house was repeatedly being searched by means of numerous police raids, Rajendra Kumar was the one who came to my rescue by staying at my house and ensuring that raids were conducted using due procedures, false evidences were not planted in the house and valuables were not stolen." Kumar was best friends with Raj Kapoor, so much so that his son Kumar Gaurav was engaged to the latter's daughter, Reema. However, their friendship fell apart after their children broke the engagement and Kumar Gaurav married Sunil Dutt and Nargis's daughter Namrata.

Death
Known to refuse taking any medication, he died at the age of 71 on 12 July 1999, just a day after his son's 43rd birthday, and just 8 days before his 72nd birthday. He died of cardiac arrest in his sleep.

Honours and recognitions

 Rajendra Kumar was honoured with the Padma Shri Award in 1970.
 He was also conferred with Justice of Peace honour and served as Honorary Magistrate.
 He was awarded the National Honour by late Pt. Jawaharlal Nehru simultaneously for Kanoon (Hindi) and Mehndi Rang Lagyo (Gujarati film).
 He received a special Lal Bahadur Shastri National Award and was associated with several charity schemes.

Awards and nominations

Filmfare Awards

Rajendra Kumar was nominated for Filmfare Award for Best Actor for three consecutive years in 1964, 1965 and 1966. In 1965, he also received an additional nomination for Best Supporting Actor.

Filmography

As actor

Producer

Presenter
 The Train (1970)
 Ganwaar (1970)
 Talash (1969)
 Phool Aur Patthar (1966)

Soundtrack
 Mere Mehboob (1963) (performer: "Mere Mehboob Tujhe", "Allah Bachaye", "Tere Pyar Mein Dildar", "Janeman Ek Nazar", "Yaad Mein Teri", "Tumse Izhar e Haal", "Mere Mehboob Mein Kya", "Ae Husn Zara Jaag", "Yaad Mein (revival) Zalzala")

Thanks
 Mera Naam Joker (1970) (acknowledgment) (as Rajender Kumar)

Self
 Raj Kapoor (1987) as Himself (during funeral)
 Star (1982) as Himself (Guest Appearance)
 Shrimanji (1968) as Himself
 Kala Bazar (1960) as Himself

Archive footage
 Film Hi Film (1983) (uncredited)

References

External links

 
 Rajendra Kumar profile at Rediff.com

1927 births
1999 deaths
Recipients of the Padma Shri in arts
Film producers from Punjab, India
Hindi-language film directors
People from Sialkot
Deaths from cancer in India
Indian male film actors
Male actors in Hindi cinema
Punjabi people
20th-century Indian male actors
20th-century Indian film directors
Filmfare Awards winners